Sibylle Canonica (born 26 April 1957) is a Swiss actress. She appeared in more than forty films since 1981. Canonica received her training at the Folkwang University of the Arts in Essen. She played at the Oldenburgisches Staatstheater, the Schiller Theater Berlin, the Staatstheater Stuttgart, the Düsseldorfer Schauspielhaus and the Munich Kammerspiele. Since 2001 she has been engaged at the Residenz Theatre in Munich.

Selected filmography

References

External links 
 

1957 births
Living people
Swiss film actresses
People from Bern
Swiss television actresses